At least two cruisers of the Soviet Navy have borne the name Murmansk, after the city and naval base of Murmansk:

Soviet cruiser Murmansk (1944) was the former , an  transferred to the USSR in 1944 and decommissioned in 1949.
 was a  launched in 1955. She was decommissioned in 1989 and sold for scrapping in 1994, but was wrecked while being towed to the breakers.

Russian Navy ship names
Soviet Navy ship names